Remixed & Rare is a compact disc compilation album by old school hip hop/electo funk group Mantronix. The album was released by EMI Gold on May 25, 2004.

Track listing
 "Got To Have Your Love Featuring Wondress (Original 12")" (Mantronik, Bryce Luvah) - 6:17
 "Take Your Time Featuring Wondress (Club Dub)" (Mantronik) - 9:31
 "Bassline (Stretched)" (Mantronik, MC Tee) - 6:01
 "Who Is It? (Dub Version)" (Mantronik, MC Tee) - 3:53
 "Don't Go Messin' With My Heart (Original 12")" (D. Bright, Angie Stone) - 4:22
 "Don't You Want More Featuring Wondress (Club Version)" (Luvah) - 6:06
 "Sing A Song (Break It Down)" (Mantronik, MC Tee) - 4:08
 "I Get Lifted" (Luvah) - 3:27
 "Step To Me (Do Me) (The Real Club Mix)" (Mantronik, Stone) - 6:19
 "This Should Move Ya" (Luvah) - 2:51
 "(I'm) Just Adjustin' My Mic (’91 Version)" (Luvah) - 3:30
 "Flower Child (Summer Of Love)" (Mantronik, Stone, Terry Taylor) - 4:58
 "Do You Like...Mantronik(?)" (Mantronik, MC Tee) - 3:23
 "Get Stupid Part IV (Get On Up ’90)" (Luvah) - 3:04

References

External links
 [ Remixed & Rare] at Allmusic

2004 greatest hits albums
Mantronix albums
2004 remix albums
Albums produced by Kurtis Mantronik
EMI Records remix albums
EMI Records compilation albums